Tara Alisha Berry is an Indian actress, known for her works in Hindi, Tamil and Telugu films. She started out with a music video with Shaan, called Khudgarzi, produced by Eros in 2011. Her debut Hindi film was Mastram.

Her next release was Chokher Bali, directed by Anurag Basu, which aired on Epic TV in 2015 as part of a series called Stories by Rabindranath Tagore.  On 11 September 2015, her film The Perfect Girl, directed by Prakash Nambiar, was released. In 2017, she starred in the first album of Gaurav Sharma Tu Pyar Hai Mera.

Tara was then signed on by Vishesh Films for a three-film deal. Her first Vishesh Films release is Love Games, directed by Vikram Bhatt produced by Vishesh Films and T-Series. In 2020, Tara again featured in the web series Mastram.

Early life
Tara is daughter of Gautam Berry (first husband of Kirron Kher) and actress Nandini Sen.

Filmography

Film

TV and web series

References

External links

 
 

1988 births
Living people
Indian film actresses
Actresses in Hindi cinema
Actresses from Mumbai
21st-century Indian actresses
Actresses in Bengali cinema
Actresses in Telugu cinema